Shlomo Dayan (born 6 November 1952) is an Israeli rabbi and former politician.

Biography
Born in Tétouan, Morocco in 1952, Dayan made aliyah to Israel in 1962. He studied at the Sha'arit Yosef yeshiva in Be'er Ya'akov and was certified as a rabbi.

He joined Shas in the 1980s, and served as a member of Jerusalem city council and deputy chairman of the city's Religious Council between 1983 and 1988. From 1985 until 1987 he chaired the party's Organisation Committee, and in 1988 was elected to the Knesset on the party's list. He was appointed a Deputy Speaker and sat on several committees until losing his seat in the 1992 elections.

In 2008 Dayan was convicted of fraud and forgery and sentenced to 4 months of community service.

See also
List of Israeli public officials convicted of crimes or misdemeanors

References

External links

1952 births
Living people
Deputy Speakers of the Knesset
Israeli Orthodox rabbis
Israeli politicians convicted of fraud
Jewish Israeli politicians
Members of the 12th Knesset (1988–1992)
Moroccan emigrants to Israel
20th-century Moroccan Jews
People from Tétouan
Rabbinic members of the Knesset
Shas politicians